= Intercoastal =

Intercoastal may refer to

- Traffic between the East Coast of the United States and West Coast of the United States
- A misspelling of "intracoastal," as in Intracoastal Waterway
